Antoine Manuel Sylvain Quintal Launay (born 28 June 1993) is a French-Portuguese slalom canoeist who has competed at the international level since 2011 when he represented France at the European Junior Championships. He has represented Portugal since 2016.

Career
Born and based in Toulouse, Launay has competed at numerous European Championship, World Championship, and World Cup events. He finished 7th in the K1 event at the 2019 World Championships. He competed in the K1 event at the delayed 2020 Summer Olympics in Tokyo, finishing in 11th position after being eliminated in the semifinal.

References

External links

1993 births
Sportspeople from Toulouse
Living people
Portuguese male canoeists
Canoeists at the 2020 Summer Olympics
Olympic canoeists of Portugal

French people of Portuguese descent